Strategic pluralism (also known as the dual-mating strategy) is a theory in evolutionary psychology regarding human mating strategies that suggests women have evolved to evaluate men in two categories: whether they are reliable long term providers, and whether they contain high quality genes. The theory of strategic pluralism was proposed by Steven Gangestad and Jeffry Simpson, two professors of psychology at the University of New Mexico and Texas A&M University, respectively.

Newer science does not support the theory that human females change mating preferences when ovulating; a 2018 review does not show women changing the type of men they desire at different times in their fertility cycle.

Experiments and studies 
Although strategic pluralism is postulated for both animals and humans, the majority of experiments have been performed with humans. One experiment concluded that between short term and long-term relationships, males and females prioritized different things. It was shown that both preferred physical attractiveness for short term mates. However, for long term, females preferred males with traits that indicated that they could be better caretakers, whereas the males did not change their priorities.

The experimenters determined using the following setup: subjects were given an overall 'budget' and asked to assign points to different traits. For long-term mates, women gave more points to social and kindness traits, agreeing with results found in other studies suggesting that females prefer long term mates who would provide resources and emotional security for them as opposed to physically attractive mates. The females also prefer males who can offer them more financial security as this would help them raise their offspring.

Females have also chosen males who have more feminine appearances because of a (hypothesized) inverse relationship between a male's facial attractiveness and effort willing to spend in raising offspring. That is, more attractive males often put in less work as a caretaker while less attractive males will put in more work. On average, there is a wider amount of variability in male characteristics than in females. This suggests there are enough of both males more suited for short-term relationships and those more suited for longer relationships.

See also 

 Ovulatory shift hypothesis
 Human mating strategies
 Extra-pair copulation
 Sexual selection in humans

References 

Evolutionary biology